Spywatch is an educational serial produced by the BBC as part of Look and Read. It originally aired on BBC2 from 15 January to 25 March 1996. Its main educational focus was World War II.

Story 
In the modern day, adult Norman Starkey goes to the fictional village of Westbourne in Shropshire where he was evacuated during the Second World War. With the help of the local librarian, he writes the story of his adventure. The modern day parts include the educational aspects, which form the middle of each episode. The main adventure is set in 1942, in the middle of World War II. Three children, young Norman, Dennis and Mary are evacuated to Westbourne, away from the bombs. The boys stay at a farm, owned by Amy Hobbs (Aunty Amy) and her granddaughter Polly, and Mary stays at Westbourne Hall with the wealthy Miss Millington and Mr Grainger. The children come across what they think is a trail of spies, but the number of suspects is very high and the children have to solve the mystery.

Episodes 

Episode 1 (Sent Away)
15 January 1996

Middle-aged Norman Starkey, a former wartime evacuee, finds his old scrapbook, and decides to write a book about his experience, so he heads back to Westbourne. He recounts being sent off to Westbourne where he meets Cyril Jenkins and another evacuee, Mary Parker. Cyril drives them to Westbourne Hall, home to Phillip Grainger, and his housekeeper, Miss Millington. They refuse to take Norman, but take Mary instead.  Norman is driven to nearby Wells Farm where he is taken in by kindly Amy Hobbs, who has recently taken in another evacuee named Dennis Sealey.

Episode 2 (Grainger Danger)
22 January 1996

Norman and Dennis, both strangers to country life, are put to work on Amy's farm by Amy's granddaughter, Polly, and are both terrified when they find themselves surrounded by cows. Meanwhile, Mary is being forced to do the housework by Grainger and Millington. Grainger also pays Wells Farm a visit and tries to get Amy to move out of the farm, to which he was the landlord, but she refuses.

Episode 3 (Spies All Around)
29 January 1996

Amy's cows have escaped and it looks as if the fence has been cut. Norman, Dennis, and Polly suspect Grainger is to blame. Later, the whole village attends a lecture where Cyril Jenkins shows them a series of posters of people who may be spies in disguise, but one poster in particular startles Norman, Dennis and Polly; an image of a woman in half a Nazi uniform and half normal clothing stays in their minds. Meanwhile, in the present, Norman decides to track down Polly.

Episode 4 (Trouble For Mary)
5 February 1996

Luigi Balzoni, an Italian P.O.W, arrives to help on the farm. Amy initially doesn't trust Luigi, but he soon wins her trust. Also, Miss Millington steals Mary's money and accuses Mary of stealing from her. Later, Mary writes a letter to her parents and gives it to Millington to post. However, Millington reads the letter in which Mary describes to her parents how horrible Grainger and Miss Millington are, how badly they're treating her, and begs them to come and get her. Millington throws the letter in the fire.

Episode 5 (The Poster Comes To Life)
12 February 1996

Norman becomes homesick after receiving a letter from his mother. He goes for a walk by the river and meets Mike Johnson, a lieutenant from the nearby U.S. Army base who shows him how to fish. Meanwhile, Mary agrees to help Polly and Dennis find out if Grainger is a spy. On the way back to the Farm, Polly and Dennis encounter a strange woman who bears a striking resemblance to the woman in the poster Cyril Jenkins showed them. When the woman asks for directions to the village, Polly, convinced she's an enemy spy, intentionally sends her the wrong way and thinks they've seen the last of her – until she turns up at the front door!

Episode 6 (Bombs In The Country)
19 February 1996

The mystery woman introduces herself as Vivienne Belling, and she claims to be a government photographer. However, the kids are suspicious of her. Meanwhile, Mary overhears an interesting conversation between Grainger and Miss Millington. Mike gives the children chocolate which is rationed. Also, Polly and Dennis spot a German plane.

Episode 7 (Surprise)
4 March 1996

Polly and Dennis narrowly avoid being killed by the German plane's bombs. Norman later spies Grainger giving a package to Vivienne Belling. Mary tries to uncover evidence to prove Grainger's a spy. Also, Norman's mother comes to visit him on his birthday. The next day, however, an even bigger surprise awaits the kids in their secret meeting place (the greenhouse at Westbourne Hall).

Episode 8 (The Pilot)
11 March 1996

The kids find an injured German pilot in the greenhouse. The pilot is later arrested, and the kids suspicions of Vivienne Belling deepen when they hear her speaking German to the pilot. Also, in another attempt to get Amy to leave the farm, Grainger pulls some strings to have Luigi moved to Westbourne Hall. That night, Mary follows Grainger and Millington to try to find out what they're up to.

Episode 9 (The Secret Quarry)
18 March 1996

The kids find a tunnel leading from an abandoned quarry to Westbourne Hall. Norman and Dennis are caught by Grainger, but are saved by Luigi, who Grainger has arrested shortly afterwards for stealing from the Hall.

Episode 10 (Captured)
25 March 1996

The children learn that Grainger and Miss Millington are simply black marketeers rather than spies. Norman and Mary try to call the police from Westbourne Hall, but are caught by Grainger and Millington and locked in a shed. Seeing them captured, Polly goes off to find a phone, only to bump into Vivienne Belling. Polly attacks her, but is stopped by Mike. Polly leads them to the quarry where Dennis has managed to free Norman and Mary, who trap Grainger and Millington in the shed. The blackmarketeers are arrested, and Vivienne Belling reveals she was investigating Grainger the whole time. Mary is moved to Wells Farm and the charges against Luigi are dropped and he returns to work on the Farm. Norman's mother arrives at the Farm to take Norman home. In the present, Norman is finally reunited with Polly.

Characters 

Norman Starkey played by Raymond Pickard
Dennis Sealey played by Russell Tovey
Mary Parker played by Josie McCabe
Polly Hobbs played by Sophie Ward
Amy Hobbs played by Rosemary Leach
Miss Millington played by Lesley Joseph
Philip Grainger played by Guy Henry
Cyril Jenkins played by Norman Bird
Luigi Balzoni played by Joseph Alessi
Vivienne Belling played by Abigail Thaw
Norman Starkey (adult) played by Keith Barron
Miss Lee played by Josie d'Arby
Cedric David Rom (CD-ROM) played by Roger Kitter
Singer (female) Janie Dee
Singer (male) Tony Timberlake
Bald-headed man/Spiv played by Andrew Tansey
Mike Johnson played by Terence Maynard
Private Wilson played by Rab Christie
Mrs Starkey played by Carol Harvey
Mrs Calver played by Pauline Delaney
Ethel Higson played by Victoria Hasted
Harrison played by Vincent Pickering
German pilot played by Reinhard Michaels
Polly Peters (Hobbs) played by Jeannie Crowther

References 

 
 

1996 British television series debuts
1996 British television series endings
1990s British children's television series
BBC children's television shows
British children's education television series
British television shows for schools
Look and Read
Reading and literacy television series
English-language television shows